The 1966 NCAA University Division basketball tournament involved 22 schools playing in single-elimination play to determine the national men's basketball champion of the NCAA University Division, now Division I. It began on March 7 and ended with the championship game on March 19 in College Park, Maryland. A total of 26 games were played, including a third place game in each region and a national third place game.

Third-ranked Texas Western (now UTEP), coached by Don Haskins, won the national title with a 72–65 victory in the final over top-ranked Kentucky, led by head coach Adolph Rupp. Haskins started five black players for the first time in NCAA Championship history. Jerry Chambers of Utah was named the tournament's Most Outstanding Player.

The 2006 film Glory Road is based on the story of the 1966 Texas Western team. Their tournament games against fourth-ranked Kansas and Kentucky are depicted in the film.

The tournament is also significant in that it was the last tournament until 2021, and one of two since the league's official founding, that the Ivy League did not send a representative to the tournament. The league champion, Penn, refused to comply with an NCAA edict that all teams must certify a 1.6 GPA for all student-athletes; the Ivy League and the university did not believe that the NCAA had the power to dictate such things, and as such the team was banned. They would have played Syracuse in the East regional at Blacksburg.

Locations

The Washington metropolitan area and College Park became the ninth host city, and Cole Field House the tenth host venue, of the Final Four. It was the first time since 1956 that the Final Four was held on a college campus. For the first time ever, the tournament was held entirely on college campuses, something that would only happen once more in the tournament's history. There were three new venues used in the 1966 tournament. The tournament made its first-ever appearance in Los Angeles when Pauley Pavilion on the campus of UCLA hosted the West regional rounds. The first round in the East was held in the state of Virginia for the first time, at Cassell Coliseum on the campus of Virginia Tech. The Mideast first round was also held in a new arena, at Memorial Gym on the campus of Kent State University. For the second straight year, the Midwest & West first rounds were combined into one venue, this time at the WSU Field House in Wichita. The 1966 tournament would mark the final time the tournament would be held at the University of Iowa; the tournament would return to Ames and Iowa State University in 1972, and Des Moines in 2016 (in games hosted by Drake University).

Teams

Bracket

East region

Mideast region

Midwest region

West region

Final Four

National Third Place Game

Regional third place games

Game summaries
The Tournament is most remembered for the all-black starting five of Texas Western defeating an all-white starting five for Kentucky in the championship game. 

Clem Haskins and Dwight Smith became the first black athletes to integrate the Western Kentucky Hilltoppers basketball program in the Fall of 1963. This put Western Kentucky at the forefront to integrate college basketball in the Southeast. The Western Kentucky Hilltoppers were 2 points away from defeating Michigan and meeting the University of Kentucky Wildcats in the Mideast regional final. A controversial foul called against Smith during a jump ball put Cazzie Russell on the free throw line for Michigan, where he scored the tying and winning baskets.

See also
 1966 NCAA College Division basketball tournament
 1966 National Invitation Tournament
 1966 NAIA Division I men's basketball tournament
 1966 NCAA University Division Basketball Championship Game
 Black participation in college basketball

References

NCAA Division I men's basketball tournament
Ncaa
Basketball competitions in Lubbock, Texas
NCAA University Division basketball tournament
NCAA University Division basketball tournament
Sports in College Park, Maryland
Basketball competitions in Maryland